Seghe Airport is an airport on Seghe in the Solomon Islands .

The Segi Point area was secured by the 4th Marine Raider Battalion on 30 June 1943 in the opening phase of the New Georgia Campaign. The 47th Naval Construction Battalion (Seabees) landed with the Marines and immediately began construction of a fighter airstrip. Bad weather and poor soil conditions delayed construction, but by 18 July a coral-surfaced  by  runway was ready for use. By the end of July taxiways and revetments had been completed.

The field was then used as a fighter strip to support the Rendova and Munda Point Landings.

USAAF units based at Segi Point included:
44th Pursuit Squadron operating P-40s

US Navy units based at Segi Point included:
VB-305 operating SBDs
VF-33 operating F6Fs
VF-38 operating F6Fs
VF-40 operating F6Fs

Airlines and destinations

References

External links
Solomon Airlines Routes

Airports in the Solomon Islands